Daniel McKorley is a Ghanaian business magnate and the founder, chairman, and Chief Executive Officer of the McDan Group of Companies. McKorley was awarded the title of Entrepreneur of the Year - 2016 at the Ghana Aviation Awards.

Early life and education
Daniel McKorley was born in La, Accra. After completing high school, he went to the University of Ghana but dropped out due to not being able to pay the tuition fee. He could only enroll for a degree 15 years later.[2] 
McKorley holds a diploma in Leadership from Lehigh University, Pennsylvania. He completed his BSc and EMBA in Business Administration and Entrepreneurship from the Ghana Institute of Management and Public Administration (GIMPA) and an honorary doctorate conferred by the London Business School.[3] He holds several post-graduate certificates in entrepreneurship, leadership, transport, and logistics, among other educational achievements.[4]

Career
Daniel McKorley is the Chief Executive Officer (CEO) of the McDan Group of Companies. He established the McDan Shipping Company in November 1999, now with headquarters in Accra and branches in Tema and Takoradi. The company has a presence in over 2000 major air and sea ports worldwide due to partnerships with Universal Freight Organization, Cross Trades, and World Cargo Alliance (WCA).

Philanthropy
McKorley presented an air-conditioned Benz Bus (Sprinter) to the Ghana Tennis Federation at the McDan Tennis Open West African Championship at the Accra Stadium in May 2017. Daniel McKorley presented an amount of GH¢10,000 to the Sports Writers Association of Ghana (SWAG) in support of the 2017 SWAG Awards Night at the Banquet Hall of the State House.

In September 2021, he supported Psalm Adjeteyfio with GH¢5,000 to aid the actor.

Honors and recognition
The achievers Award by West Africa Regional magazine
Ernst & Young entrepreneur of West Africa Nominee -  2015
The Entrepreneur of the year - 2016
Freight Forwarding and entrepreneur of the year - 2013
CIMG Marketing Man of the Year 2017

Personal life
McKorley is married to Abigail McKorley and Roberta Mckorley and they have children. Daniel McKorley, has been convicted by the Accra High Court for contempt.He was found guilty after the court held that he had deliberately disobeyed orders of the High Court over a disputed parcel of lands at East Legon.

References

Ghanaian businesspeople
Living people
20th-century Ghanaian people
Year of birth missing (living people)